Samuel Lambeth White (August 23, 1893 – November 11, 1929) was an English born Major League Baseball player. White played in only one game, for the Boston Braves in the 1919 season; he went 0 for 1. He batted left-handed and threw right-handed.

White was born in Kinsley, England, and died in Philadelphia, Pennsylvania, where he was interred in Cedar Hill Cemetery.

External links

1893 births
1929 deaths
People from the City of Wakefield
Major League Baseball catchers
Boston Braves players
Major League Baseball players from the United Kingdom
Major League Baseball players from England
English baseball players
Sportspeople from Yorkshire